Soccer's Hard Men is a 1992 football video by Video Vision, presented by then-footballer and current actor Vinnie Jones. The video featured footage of British players (some still playing at the time and others who had by then retired) known for their ferocity, including Graeme Souness, Bryan Robson, Nobby Stiles, Norman Hunter, Jack Charlton, Steve McMahon, Tommy Smith, Peter Storey, Ron "Chopper Harris" and Billy Bremner. Publicity for the video described it as "the toughest football video in history". This and similar claims led to accusations that the video glorified foul play. Jones' commentary, in which he described tricks used by "hard man" players to intimidate opponents, caused particular controversy.

The clubs of the players involved in the production were quick to distance themselves from the contents. Sam Hammam, chairman of Wimbledon, whose "Crazy Gang" featured heavily in the video, said the production was "nothing to do with Wimbledon", describing Jones (who played for Wimbledon) as "a mosquito brain", and banning the sale of the video in the club shop. The Football Association formally charged Jones with bringing the game into disrepute on 30 September 1992, with the video still yet to be released. Following a hearing on 17 November, Jones was fined a record £20,000, surpassing a fine of £8,500 issued to Paul McGrath three years earlier. Jones also received a suspended sentence with the potential for a six-month ban, though the period of the suspended sentence expired without the ban being enacted.

The Professional Footballers' Association (PFA) attempted to bring an injunction to ban the video, but abandoned their efforts after being advised that it was not legally viable. PFA chief executive Gordon Taylor later gave evidence in support of Jones at an appeal hearing, held in February 1993. Jones' appeal was rejected, and his punishment upheld.

Figures from London bookshop Sportspages listed Soccer's Hard Men as the second-best selling sports video in the run-up to Christmas 1992.

References

External links
 

1992 films
British association football films
1992–93 in English football
1992–93 in Scottish football
1990s English-language films
1990s British films